PC Screen Font (PSF) is a bitmap font format currently employed by the Linux kernel for console fonts. Documentation of the PSF file format can be found within the source code of the Linux  kbd utilities. The format is described by the University Eindhoven.

File format

File header 

Every PSF file begins with a header. There are two header types: PSF1 and PSF2. All multibyte integers are in least significant byte order (little endian).

All psf1 glyphs are 8 pixels wide.

Font modes 

The font mode in a psf1 header is an 8 bit unsigned integer containing various flags about the font

Font flags 

The font flags field in a psf2 header is a 32 bit unsigned integer containing various flags about the font. There is currently only one flag.

File bitmaps 

The actual glyph data immediately follows the header. Each bit in each glyph represents one pixel in the font: 0 for undrawn, 1 for drawn. Each row of each glyph is padded to a whole number of bytes. For example, a 12x12 font would have 2 bytes per row. The letter 'A' in a 12x12 PSF bitmap may look like this:

           padding
 Font data    |
+----------+ +--+
000001100000 0000
000011110000 0000
000110011000 0000
001100001100 0000
011000000110 0000
110000000011 0000
111111111111 0000
111111111111 0000
110000000011 0000
110000000011 0000
110000000011 0000
110000000011 0000

with twelve bits of actual data and padding to fill each row to the nearest byte. Rows are stored left-most column first.

The unicode table 

If a PSF file contains a unicode table, then every glyph has an entry in the unicode table, with the first glyph corresponding to the first entry in the table, the second glyph the second entry, and so on. The format of an entry in the unicode table depends on the type of the PSF header.

The PSF1 unicode table 

Entries in the unicode table of a PSF1 file are represented as a series of 16 bit little-endian unsigned integers ending in 0xffff. The first integers in the entry contain a unicode character represented by the corresponding glyph. These unicode characters continue until the integer 0xFFFE is encountered. Then, starting from the 0xfffe value, rather than representing individual unicode characters, the numbers represent series of unicode characters that correspond to the glyph, starting a new series with every 0xfffe encountered, and stopping once 0xffff is encountered. For example, the following series of 16 bit little-endian unsigned integers would be interpreted in the following way:

0xdead
0xbeef

0xfffe
0x3141
0x5926

0xfffe
0x1234
0x5678

0xffff

Whenever either U+dead, U+beef, the sequence U+3141 U+5926, or the sequence U+1234 U+5678 is seen, display the glyph corresponding to this unicode table entry.

The PSF2 unicode table 

Entries in the unicode table of a PSF2 file are the same as those in a PSF1 file, except unicode characters are represented in UTF-8, unicode sequences begin with the one byte sequence 0xfe rather than the two byte sequence 0xfffe, and unicode entries end with the one byte sequence 0xff rather than the two byte sequence 0xffff.

References 

Font formats
Raster typefaces